Shek Pik Prison is located at 47 Shek Pik Reservoir Road, Shek Pik, Lantau Island, Hong Kong. It was built in 1984, and is managed by the Hong Kong Correctional Services. The prison is used to contain prisoners with medium to long sentences, along with those sentenced to life imprisonment.

History
Shek Pik Prison officially opened in 1984 as a maximum-security facility with a capacity of 466 prisoners, helping to relieve Stanley Prison. It cost approximately HK$135 million to construct. The prison was built with high-tech security features including a 160-camera video surveillance system and infrared perimeter alarm, as well as a solar energy water heating system, the government's largest such solar energy system at that time.

Description
The prison remains a maximum-security institution. It now has an official capacity of 426.

It is located below the dam of the Shek Pik Reservoir.

Notable prisoners 
 Lam Kor-wan – serial killer
 Edward Leung – political activist
 Razaq Nadeem – serial killer, committed suicide on 3 November 2016
 Benny Tai – political activist
 Joshua Wong – political activist

References 

1984 establishments in Hong Kong
Shek Pik
Prisons in Hong Kong